Brett Smiley (September 25, 1955 – January 8, 2016) was an American singer-songwriter who was active in the UK during the glam rock era of the early 1970s. Smiley released one single, "Va Va Va Voom," and made an appearance on the Russell Harty television show, where he performed the song "Space Ace". In 2003, a previously unheard album called "Breathlessly Brett" was released. One posthumous vinyl album entitled "Sunset Tower" was released in 2019.

Career
Smiley was born in Indiana and began his career as a child actor, playing Oliver on Broadway for four years. He also appeared in many television commercials.

In 1974, Smiley—who, at the time, was managed and produced by Rolling Stones manager Andrew Loog Oldham—recorded an album, Breathlessly Brett. However, Oldham feared that the album, which included the songs "Va Va Va Voom" and "Space Ace", would sell poorly, and refused to release it. However, it was eventually released in 2003, when RPM Records included it as part of its Lipsmackin' 70s collection.

Smiley also starred as the Prince, in the 1977 American erotic musical comedy Cinderella.

In 2004, rock biographer Nina Antonia published a book about Smiley, The Prettiest Star: Whatever Happened to Brett Smiley.

In 2006, Smiley contributed to the charity album Not Alone.

Smiley still performed occasionally until 2015 in New York City, and was recording songs for a new CD. He died on January 8, 2016, after a lengthy battle with HIV and hepatitis. His cause of death, though, was a head injury from falling down.

In 2019, a posthumous album, Sunset Tower, was released for Record Store Day, with a total of 1000 vinyl records being pressed, as well as it being available online on the website Bandcamp. The album consists entirely of demos recorded between 1969 and 1973 that were later reworked for Breathlessly Brett, or scrapped entirely.

Discography

Singles 

 Va Va Va Voom/Space Ace (1974)

Albums 

 Breathlessly Brett (2003) track listing:

 "Brett's Lullaby"
 "Highty Tighty"
 "Space Ace"
 "April in Paris"
 "Solitaire"
 "Va Va Va Voom"
 "Run for the Sun"
 "I Want to Hold Your Hand" (Lennon–McCartney)
 "Pre-Columbian Love"
 "Queen of Hearts"
 "I Can't Help Myself"/"Over the Rainbow"
 "Young at Heart"

 Sunset Tower (2019) track listing:

 Highty Tighty
 Cherry Hookers
 Abstracted Billy
 Mood in Deco
 Space Ace
 Queen of Hearts
 Lying in the Sun
 Diamonds Couldn't Bring You Back

Other 

 Our Lady of the Barren Tree (Not Alone, 2006)

References

Further reading

Wired Up by Jeremy Thompson and Mary Blount,

External links

Whatever happened to Brett Smiley?
 Magnet Magazine Article About Brett Smiley by Kristian Hoffman
YouTube Brett Smiley on the Russell Harty show
Sunset Tower on Bandcamp

1955 births
2016 deaths
20th-century American male actors
20th-century American musicians
21st-century American musicians
American male child actors
American male singers
American male film actors
American male stage actors
American rock singers
Glam rock musicians
Singers from New York City
20th-century American male musicians
21st-century American male musicians